Sveadal is a private summer resort in an unincorporated area of Llagas-Uvas in Santa Clara County, California. The Swedish American cultural heritage and recreation center is situated west of Morgan Hill, California in the eastern Santa Cruz Mountains, adjacent to Uvas Canyon County Park. Since its founding in 1926, it has been owned and operated by the Swedish American Patriotic League, a congress of local organizations, dedicated to promoting and perpetuating common Swedish-American heritage in the San Francisco Bay Area.  It has been visited by three generations of Swedish royalty, since 1927 when then Crown Prince (and later King) Gustav VI Adolf of Sweden and his wife dedicated Sveadal in 1927.

Access to Sveadal is via Croy Road, a two-lane paved secondary road off Uvas Road (County Route G8) with no outlet that narrows to a single lane within Sveadal.  Visitors to Uvas Canyon County Park must pass through Sveadal. There are both private cabins and rental units for club members on site. The ZIP Code is 95037 and the community is inside area codes 408 and 669.

Swedish Organizations
 Swedish American Patriotic League of San Francisco 
 Vasa Order of America 
 Swedish Club of San Francisco Bay Area 
 Swedish Council of America 
 Swedish American Chambers of Commerce of the USA

References

External links
Sveadal - Official site

Swedish migration to North America
Swedish-American culture in California